The 2020–21 Tercera División was the last for this league as the fourth tier of Spanish football. It began in October 2020 and ended in June 2021 with the second phase and promotion play-off final in the Canarian group.

Because the Royal Spanish Football Federation (RFEF) suspended the previous season on 11 March 2020 at the onset of the COVID-19 pandemic in Spain, the RFEF announced on 6 May the termination of that season, the revocation of all relegations from the Segunda B and Tercera divisions, and the expansion of both leagues. Each regional federation was allowed to plan its own group for the 2020–21 season and as this season became somewhat shorter than usual, the RFEF recommended the subdivision of each region into two groups in the first phase for ease of scheduling, with a final phase in which the teams regrouped based on initial positions.

Also, the Tercera División dropped down to the fifth level and Segunda B to the fourth, with Tercera suffixing the federation's Spanish initials RFEF to its name and Segunda B replacing the B with those initials after the creation of a new, two-group, 40-team third division called Primera División RFEF that would begin in 2021–22.

Competition format
The top eligible teams in each initial group played in the promotion and play-off groups.
The first placers of each final group qualified for the 2021–22 Copa del Rey. If the placer was a reserve team, the first non-reserve team qualified would join the Copa.
In each relegation group, at least five or six teams were relegated to regional divisions.

First phase

Group 1 – Galicia

Teams and locations

Subgroup A

Subgroup B

Group 2 – Asturias

Teams and locations

Subgroup A

Subgroup B

Group 3 – Cantabria

Teams and locations

Subgroup A

Subgroup B

Group 4 – Basque Country

Teams and locations

Subgroup A

Subgroup B

Group 5 – Catalonia

Teams and locations

Subgroup A

Subgroup B

Group 6 – Valencian Community

Teams and locations

Subgroup A

Subgroup B

Group 7 – Community of Madrid

Teams and locations

Subgroup A

Subgroup B

Group 8 – Castile and León

Teams and locations

Subgroup A

Subgroup B

Group 9 – Eastern Andalusia and Melilla

Teams and locations

Subgroup A

Subgroup B

Group 10 – Western Andalusia and Ceuta

Teams and locations

Subgroup A

Subgroup B

Group 11 – Balearic Islands

Teams and locations

Subgroup A

Subgroup B

Group 12 – Canary Islands

Teams and locations

Subgroup A

Subgroup B

Group 13 – Region of Murcia

Teams and locations

Subgroup A

Subgroup B

Group 14 – Extremadura

Teams and locations

Subgroup A

Subgroup B

Group 15 – Navarre

Teams and locations

Subgroup A

Subgroup B

Group 16 – La Rioja

Teams and locations

Subgroup A

Subgroup B

Group 17 – Aragon

Teams and locations

Subgroup A

Subgroup B

Group 18 – Castilla-La Mancha

Teams and locations

Subgroup A

Subgroup B

Second phase

Promotion groups

Group 1C

Group 2C

Group 3C

Group 4C

Group 5C

Group 6C

Group 7C

Group 8C

Group 9C

Group 10C

Group 11C

Group 12C

Group 13C

Group 14C

Group 15C

Group 16C

Group 17C

Group 18C

Promotion play-off groups

Group 1

Group 2

Group 3

Group 4

Group 5

Group 6

Group 7

Group 8

Group 9

Group 10

Group 11

Group 12

Group 13

Group 14

Group 15

Group 16

Group 17

Group 18

Relegation groups

Group 1

Group 2

Group 3

Group 4

Group 5

Group 6

Group 7

Group 8

Group 9

Group 10

Group 11

Group 12

Group 13

Group 14

Group 15

Group 16

Group 17

Group 18

Play-offs

References

External links
Royal Spanish Football Federation website

 
Tercera División seasons
4
Spain